Qarah Veysi (also Romanized as Qarah Veysī; also known as Qarah Veys) is a village in Mazu Rural District, Alvar-e Garmsiri District, Andimeshk County, Khuzestan Province, Iran. At the 2006 census, its population was 37, in 9 families.

References 

Populated places in Andimeshk County